Guðmundur Andri Thorsson is an editor, critic, and author born in Iceland on 31 December 1957. He received his degree in literature in 1983 from the University of Iceland. His first work was as a literary critic in the 1980s.

His first novel, Mín káta angist came out in 1988 and he has had three more novels since then. He has also written several articles which have been collected into a book. In 2013 his novel Sæmd was nominated for the Icelandic Literary Prize.

Major works
 Mín káta angist, novel, 1988.
 Íslenski draumurinn, novel, 1991.
 Íslandsförin, novel, 1996.
 Ég vildi að ég kynni að dansa, articles, 1998.
 Náðarkraftur, novel, 2003.
 Stutt ágrip af sögu traktorsins á úkraínsku, novel, translated from Marina Lewycka, via English, 2006
 Tveir húsvagnar, novel, translated from Marina Lewycka, via English, 2007
 Segðu mömmu að mér líði vel, novel, 2008.
 Valeyrarvalsinn, story-cycle, 2011.
 Sæmd, novel about Benedikt Sveinbjarnarson Gröndal, 2013
 Og svo tjöllum við okkur í rallið : bókin um Thor, biography, 2015
 Hæg breytileg átt, poetry, 2016

References

External links
Edda.is
Bokmenntir

Icelandic writers
Thorsson, Gudmundur Andri
Thorsson, Gudmundur Andri
Thors family